Zahájí is a municipality and village in České Budějovice District in the South Bohemian Region of the Czech Republic. It has about 500 inhabitants.

History
The first written mention of Zahájí is from 1352, originally named Vavřinčice. The name Zahájí first appeared in 1399 and has been used ever since.

Zahájí is known for the Battle of Sahay, which was a small battle between French and Austrians in 1742, during the War of the Austrian Succession.

References

Villages in České Budějovice District